Janez Stanič (4 January 1937 – 28 October 1996) was a Slovene journalist and translator. He was considered one of the best socio-political analysts of his generation and was often outspoken and critical of the Soviet regime.

Stanič was born in Ljubljana in 1937. He studied Slovene and Russian at the University of Ljubljana and graduated in 1961. He worked for the newspaper Delo, first as their Moscow correspondent and later as an editor. From 1975 he worked at the Slovene National Broadcaster and from 1991 as head of the Cankarjeva Založba publishing house. He died in Ljubljana in 1996.

He won the Levstik Award in 1968 for his book  (The Other Side of the Kremlin).

Selected published works

  (The Other Side of the Kremlin), 1968
  (The Czechoslovak Danger, Prague Spring and Prague Winter), 1969
  (The Known and Unknown Soviet Union), 1978
  (Communismns Crossroads), 1980
  (White Patches of Socialism), 1986
  (Chronicles of the Turning Point), collection of articles from 1985 to 1995), 1997

References

1937 births
1996 deaths
Slovenian translators
Journalists from Ljubljana
Levstik Award laureates
University of Ljubljana alumni
20th-century translators
20th-century journalists